Thomas A. Butler may refer to the following people:

Thomas Adair Butler (1836–1901), English recipient of the Victoria Cross
Thomas Ambrose Butler (1837–1897), Irish-American priest and author